Brush Prairie, also known as Brushy Creek, is a community founded in 1900 in Trinity County, Texas on FM 1280 11 miles from Groveton, near Zion Hill.

References

Unincorporated communities in Trinity County, Texas
Unincorporated communities in Texas
1900 establishments in Texas